Einar Modig (28 November 1883 – 10 March 1960) was a Swedish diplomat. After graduating from Uppsala University in 1907, Moding joined the Swedish Ministry for Foreign Affairs. He served eight years in South America as envoy in various country and during World War II, Moding served as Swedish envoy in Ankara and Athens. After the war, he served as envoy in Brussels and Luxembourg City.

Early life
Modig was born on 28 November 1883 in Stockholm, Sweden, the son of Otto Walfrid Modig, an accountant, and his wife Maria Fredrika Lovisa Landgren. He passed mogenhetsexamen at Nya Elementarskolan in Stockholm on 15 May 1901 and enrolled at Uppsala University the same year. Modig received a Bachelor of Arts degree from Uppsala University in 1903, a Licentiate of Philosophy degree in 1905 and a Candidate of Law degree in 1907 before becoming an attaché at the Ministry for Foreign Affairs the same year.

Career
Modig served as attaché in Kristiania in 1907 and in Antwerp and Berlin in 1908. He was back in Sweden serving as a second secretary at the Foreign Ministry in 1910. He was acting secretary in the National Board of Trade from 1911 to 1914. He was secretary in the trade council in 1912 and secretary in the National Board of Trade from 1913 to 1914 and secretary of the board of directors of the 1915 exhibition in San Francisco from 1913 to 1915.

He was extra rapporteur in the Ministry of Finance from 1914 to 1915 and a member of the State Trade Commission in 1915 as well as vice CEO of Sydsvenska kreditaktiebolaget in 1916 and vice CEO and board member of the Nordiska Kompaniet from 1916 to 1922. Modig was then chairman of the Service Commission of the Swedish Customs Service from 1922 to 1924 and had assignments in Europe and United States for Grängesbergsbolaget from 1925 to 1926. He was Sweden's representative at the diplomatic conference on the suspension of import and export bans in Geneva from 1927 to 1928 and chairman of the board of the merchant navy pension institution (Handelsflottans pensionsanstalt). Modig was also chairman of the Baltic freight transport conference in Stockholm in 1929. Modig was State Secretary and Director-General for Administrative Affairs in the Ministry of Trade from 1926 to 1930. He was then envoy in Lima from 1931 to 1934 and at the same time non-resident envoy in La Paz, Quito, Bogotá and Caracas.

Modig was envoy in Buenos Aires and at the same time non-resident envoy in Santiago, Montevideo and Asunción from 1934 to 1939 and was he chairman of the 1939 Trade Commission from 1939 to 1941 and in the Swedish delegation in trade negotiations with Italy in 1940. He was then envoy in Ankara and non-resident envoy Athens from 1939 to 1945 but he didn't take office until 1941. Modig was envoy in Brussels from 1945 to 1948 and as non-resident envoy in Luxembourg City from 1946 to 1948 and then served at the Foreign Ministry in Stockholm. He was chairman of the delegation in trade negotiations with the Soviet Union with several countries from 1948, chairman and head of the Foreign Capital Control Office (Flyktkapitalbyrån) from 1945 to 1946 and chairman of the committee of the Chicago Fair in 1949. Modig was a board member of the Jungnerbolagen from 1948, chairman there in 1952 and was chairman of the Exports Association (Exportföringen) study delegation in Africa from 1952 to 1953 and in Colombia in 1954.

Personal life
In 1911 he married Maina Tanninen (1892–1984), the daughter of the wholesaler Max Tanninen and Maria Makowski. Their son, Jan-Otto Modig (1914–2005), was CEO of Tidningarnas Telegrambyrå and vice CEO of Sveriges Radio.

Death
Modig died on 10 March 1960 in Stockholm and was buried on 6 May 1960 at Norra begravningsplatsen in Stockholm.

Awards and decorations
Modig's awards:

Commander Grand Cross of the Order of the Polar Star
Knight of the Order of Vasa
Grand Cross of the Order of the Crown
Grand Cross of the Order of the White Rose of Finland
Grand Cross of the Order of the Crown of Italy
Grand Cross of the Order of the Oak Crown
Grand Cross of the Order of the Sun of Peru
Grand Cross of the Order of Merit of the Republic of Hungary
Grand Officer of the Order of the German Eagle
Grand Officer of the Order of Bolivar
Commander First Class of the Order of Polonia Restituta
Officer of the Legion of Honour
Knight First Class of the Order of the Zähringer Lion
Knight Fourth Class of the Order of the Crown

Bibliography

References

External links
Article in Svenskt biografiskt lexikon 
Article by Einar Modig 

1883 births
1960 deaths
Ambassadors of Sweden to Peru
Ambassadors of Sweden to Colombia
Ambassadors of Sweden to Bolivia
Ambassadors of Sweden to Venezuela
Ambassadors of Sweden to Ecuador
Ambassadors of Sweden to Argentina
Ambassadors of Sweden to Chile
Ambassadors of Sweden to Paraguay
Ambassadors of Sweden to Uruguay
Ambassadors of Sweden to Turkey
Ambassadors of Sweden to Greece
Ambassadors of Sweden to Belgium
Ambassadors of Sweden to Luxembourg
People from Stockholm
Uppsala University alumni
Burials at Norra begravningsplatsen
Commanders Grand Cross of the Order of the Polar Star
Knights of the Order of Vasa